Sharan Pasricha  is an Indian born entrepreneur based in London, England. He is most known for founding Ennismore, a global hospitality developer and operator and for the acquisition and growth of The Hoxton and Gleneagles.

Ennismore was included in Fast Company’s World’s Most Innovative Companies List in 2020 and 2021, ranked #30 in Britain's fastest growing private companies in the Sunday Times Fast Track 100 and is included in the Financial Times’ FT1000: Europe's fastest growing companies. In October 2021 it was announced that Ennismore and Accor completed on a €1 billion joint venture creating the world’s largest and fastest-growing lifestyle hospitality company.

Early life and education 
Pasricha was educated at the Doon School in India and Millfield School in Somerset. He then completed an Accounting & Finance degree from Regent's College and subsequently an MBA from London Business School where he was awarded the Alumni GOLD (Graduate of the Last Decade) by the Dean in 2018.

Career 
While at Regent's College, Pasricha founded RUSH! Media, a venture capital backed Media & Marketing agency based in London. He spent three years running the business after leaving university in London before returning to India to  run his uncle's leather manufacturing business. He spent 3 years as a turnaround CEO in New Delhi and returned the business to profit in 18 months.

In 2009, he married Eiesha Bharti and returned to England. The same year, he undertook an MBA at London Business School, while working at a private equity investment firm, Better Capital.

Upon completing his MBA in 2011, Pasricha founded Ennismore backed by a group of investors and tried to acquire Soho House with the help of its founder Nick Jones. A year later, Ennismore acquired the Hoxton Hotel in Shoreditch.  In November 2012, Ennismore acquired an office building in Holborn which would later become The Hoxton, Holborn. The following year Pasricha launched The Hoxton, Amsterdam. In 2017, The Hoxton, Paris opened following a 4-year restoration of an 18th-century hôtel particulier, designated a 'monument historique' by the French state. It opened its first US location with The Hoxton, Williamsburg in 2018, followed shortly by The Hoxton, Portland. The Hoxton, Chicago is due to open April 2019, followed by The Hoxton, Downtown LA and The Hoxton, Southwark later in the year. The hotel brand will open hotels in Barcelona, Berlin, Brussels, London’s Shepherd’s Bush and Vienna, following the opening of its tenth hotel in Rome in May 2021.

In the summer of 2015, Pasricha acquired the Gleneagles Hotel in Perthshire which was owned by drinks company Diageo. Since 2016, the hotel has undergone over 12 major renovation projects including The Century Bar; The American Bar; The Birnam Brasserie; Dormy Restaurant and Auchterarder 70; Ochil House; Bob & Cloche; and Little Glen & The Den. The refurbishment programme has been attributed to a jump in revenues and operating profits to more than £1 million per week during 2018. Gleneagles has won a number of awards.

Pasricha occasionally speaks at entrepreneurial and hospitality industry conferences. In 2018, he appeared in The Caterer Top 100, placing #68 overall and #14 among hoteliers. He also featured in Conde Nast Traveller’s ‘48 People Changing The Way We Travel’. In 2019, he was named as one of the 50 Most Influential People in British Luxury.

In 2020 it was announced that Pasricha’s Hoxton hotel chain would merge with Europe’s largest hotel company Accor. The merger was completed in October 2021. The new entity operates under the Ennismore name and is two-thirds owned by Accor and a third by Pasricha. Pasricha excluded Ennismore’s hotel assets from the joint venture. He became co-chief executive of the company, alongside the chief development officer at Accor, Gaurav Bhushan.

Pasricha was appointed Member of the Order of the British Empire (MBE) in the 2022 Birthday Honours for services to the hotel industry.

Personal life 
Pasricha lives in London with his wife, Eiesha Bharti Pasricha, and their two children. Sharan's father-in-law is Sunil Mittal, the founder and CEO of Bharti Airtel and brother-in-law is Kavin Bharti Mittal, the founder and CEO of hike Messenger.

References 

British businesspeople
Alumni of London Business School
Regent University alumni
The Doon School alumni
1980 births
Living people
Indian emigrants to the United Kingdom
Members of the Order of the British Empire
Naturalised citizens of the United Kingdom
People educated at Millfield